Edward Montgomery Clift (October 17, 1920 – July 23, 1966) was an American actor. A four-time Academy Award nominee, he was known for his portrayal of "moody, sensitive young men", according to The New York Times.

He is best remembered for his roles in Howard Hawks's Red River (1948), George Stevens's A Place in the Sun (1951), Fred Zinnemann's From Here to Eternity (1953), Stanley Kramer's Judgment at Nuremberg (1961), and John Huston's The Misfits (1961).

Along with Marlon Brando and James Dean, Clift was considered one of the original method actors in Hollywood (though Clift distanced himself from the term); he was one of the first actors to be invited to study in the Actors Studio with Lee Strasberg and Elia Kazan. He also executed a rare move by not signing a contract after arriving in Hollywood, only doing so after his first two films were a success. This was described as "a power differential that would go on to structure the star–studio relationship for the next 40 years". A documentary titled Making Montgomery Clift was made by his nephew in 2018, to clarify many myths that were created about the actor.

Early life and early career

Edward Montgomery Clift was born on October 17, 1920, in Omaha, Nebraska. His father, William Brooks "Bill" Clift (1886–1964), was the vice-president of Omaha National Trust Company. His mother was Ethel Fogg "Sunny" Clift (née Anderson; 1888–1988). His parents were Quakers and met as students at Cornell University, marrying in 1914. Clift had a twin sister, Roberta (who later went by "Ethel"), who survived him by 48 years, and an older brother, William Brooks Clift, Jr. (1919–1986), known as "Brooks," who had a son with actress Kim Stanley and was later married to political reporter Eleanor Clift. Clift had English and Scottish ancestry on his father's side, wealthy relatives who hailed from Chattanooga, Tennessee. An adopted child, his mother Sunny maintained that Clift’s true maternal great-grandfathers were the US postmaster-general Montgomery Blair as well as Union commander Robert Anderson, a part of her lineage that was clarified to her (when she came of age) by Dr. Edward Montgomery, the family doctor who delivered her. She spent the rest of her life trying to gain the recognition of her alleged relations. 

Part of Clift's mother's effort was her determination that her children should be brought up in the style of true aristocrats. Thus, as long as Clift's father was able to pay for it, he and his siblings were privately tutored, travelled extensively in America and Europe, became fluent in German and French, and led a protected life, sheltered from the destitution and communicable diseases which became legion following the First World War. At age 7, aboard a European ship, a boy forced Clift’s head underwater in the swimming pool for so long that a gland in his neck burst from his struggle to breathe; he had a long scar from the resulting infection and operation. The Wall Street Crash of 1929 and the Great Depression of the 1930s ruined Clift's father financially; Bill was forced to downsize and move to Chicago to take a new job while Sunny continued traveling with the children. In a 1957 issue of McCall’s magazine, Clift quipped, "My childhood was hobgoblin, my parents traveled a lot…That’s all I can remember."

Early theater career: 1934–1946
Clift had shown an interest in acting and theatrics as a child living in Switzerland and France but did not take the initiative to go out for a part in a local production until age 13, when his family was forced to downsize and relocate from Chicago to Sarasota, Florida. He had a small non-paying role. Close to a year later, around the time the family moved again, settling in New York City, Clift debuted on Broadway at 14 years old as Harmer Masters in the comedy Fly Away Home which ran from January to July 1935 at the 48th Street Theatre. The New York World-Telegram noticed Clift’s "amazing poise and dexterity" while producer Theo Bamberger commended him for what he called a "natural histrionic instinct." Clift spent a short time at the Dalton School in Manhattan but struggled with traditional schooling. He instead continued to flourish onstage and appeared in works by Moss Hart and Cole Porter, Robert Sherwood, Lillian Hellman, Tennessee Williams, and Thornton Wilder, creating the part of Henry in the original production of The Skin of Our Teeth. Clift proved to be a successful young stage actor working with, among others, Dame May Whitty, Alla Nazimova, Mary Boland, Cornelia Otis Skinner, Fredric March, Tallulah Bankhead, Alfred Lunt, and Lynn Fontanne. In 1939, as a member of the cast of the 1939 Broadway production of Noël Coward's Hay Fever, Clift participated in one of the first television broadcasts in the United States: the Hay Fever performance was broadcast by NBC's New York television station W2XBS (the forerunner of WNBC) and was aired during the 1939 New York World's Fair. At age 20, he appeared in the Broadway production of There Shall Be No Night, a work which won the 1941 Pulitzer Prize for Drama.

Clift also had participated in radio broadcasts early in his career, though, according to one critic, he hated the medium. On May 24, 1944, he was part of the cast of Eugene O'Neill's Ah, Wilderness! for The Theatre Guild on the Air. In 1949, as part of the promotional campaign for the film The Heiress, he played Heathcliff in the one-hour version of Wuthering Heights for Ford Theatre. In January 1951, he participated in the episode "The Metal in the Moon" for the series Cavalcade of America, sponsored by the chemical company DuPont Company. Also in 1951, Clift was for the first time cast as Tom in the radio world premiere of Tennessee Williams' The Glass Menagerie, with Helen Hayes (Amanda) and Karl Malden (the Gentleman Caller), for The Theatre Guild on the Air.

Clift did not serve during World War II, having been given 4-F status after suffering dysentery in 1942. Immediately following the end of the war in September 1945 (in what would be Clift's penultimate Broadway performance) he starred in the stage adaptation of D.H. Lawrence's short story You Touched Me. He and actor Kevin McCarthy later wrote a screenplay for a film adaptation that was never made. By this time, Clift had developed what would come to be regarded as his signature acting style and biggest impact on the future of modern film acting, as told by biographer Robert LaGuardia:

Adult career

Rise to film stardom: 1946–1956

At age 25, Clift's first Hollywood film role was opposite John Wayne in the Western film Red River whose director Howard Hawks was impressed by his recent stage performance and was willing to sign him with no strings attached, which greatly appealed to Clift's sense of independence. Although filmed in 1946, the film was delayed release until August 1948. A critical and commercial success, the film was nominated for two Academy Awards. 

Clift's second film role, though it premiered first that same year, was The Search which earned him his first nomination for an Academy Award for Best Actor. Clift's naturalistic performance led to director Fred Zinnemann's being asked, "Where did you find a soldier who can act so well?" Clift was unhappy with the quality of the script, and reworked it himself. The film was awarded a screenwriting Academy Award for the credited writers. MGM distributed the film nationwide as magazines generated massive attention for Clift. 

Paramount Pictures ended up offering him the best of any incoming studio offer (which he accepted): a three-film deal (down from the typical seven-year contract) that came with the freedom to turn down any script and any director, as well as the ability for either himself or the studio to terminate the agreement at any time. 

Every major Hollywood studio wanted to make a deal with Clift and was collectively shocked that a young actor could command such leverage after the release of a single film: "the death knell of the producers and the moguls, and the birth of Actor Power." Clift was on the cover of Life magazine by December 1948. Look magazine gave him its Achievement Award and called him "the most promising star on the Hollywood horizon.

Clift's first film for Paramount was The Heiress (1949). While director William Wyler notably had difficulty with his poor posture, co-star Olivia de Havilland expressed difficulty with his seriousness, saying that "Monty was painstaking and I liked that about him, but I had a sense that Monty was thinking almost entirely of himself and leaving me out of the scene." 

He tended to funnel most of his energy into intense rehearsals with acting coach Mira Rostova who accompanied him on set. Overall he ended up unhappy with his performance and left early during the film's premiere. The following summer in 1949, Clift shot The Big Lift in Berlin: intended to be more of a semi-documentary, pro-America wartime film and less of an acting vehicle, but still a welcome opportunity to portray a U.S. soldier.

Clift's next role as the drifter George Eastman in A Place in the Sun (1951) is regarded as one of his signature method acting performances. He worked extensively on his character, and was again nominated for an Academy Award for Best Actor. For his character's scenes in jail, Clift spent a night in a real state prison. 

His main acting rival (and fellow Omaha native), Marlon Brando, was so moved by Clift's performance that he voted for Clift to win the Academy Award for Best Actor, sure that he would win. That year, Clift voted for Brando in A Streetcar Named Desire. 

A Place in the Sun was critically acclaimed; Charlie Chaplin called it "the greatest movie made about America". The film received added media attention due to the rumors that Clift and co-star Elizabeth Taylor were dating in real life. 

After a break, Clift committed himself to three more films, all of which premiered during 1953: I Confess to be directed by Alfred Hitchcock; Vittorio De Sica's Terminal Station; and Fred Zinnemann's From Here to Eternity which earned Clift his third Academy Award nomination (his second of two nominations for films directed by Zinnemann). For the latter, Clift committed to building strength and endurance, jogging laps around Hollywood High School as well as learning how to imitate playing the bugle and reading sheet music from trumpeter Mannie Klein for the role of middleweight boxer and bugle-playing soldier Private Robert E. Lee Prewitt.

Car crash
On the evening of May 12, 1956, while filming Raintree County, Clift was involved in a serious car crash after leaving a dinner party hosted by Elizabeth Taylor and her husband, Michael Wilding. Clift had veered off one of the twisting hairpin turns and smashed into a telephone pole and the surrounding cliffside. Alerted by friend Kevin McCarthy, who witnessed the collision, Taylor found Clift conscious yet bleeding and swelling rapidly under the shattered dashboard. She pulled a hanging tooth that was cutting into his tongue, before accompanying him into the ambulance. 

He suffered a concussion, broken jaw, broken nose, fractured sinuses, fractured cheekbones, and several facial lacerations which required plastic surgery. In a filmed interview years later in 1963, Clift described his injuries in detail, including how his broken nose could be snapped back into place.

After a two-month recovery period, Clift returned to the set to finish the film. Despite the studio's concerns over profits, Clift correctly predicted the film would do well, if only because moviegoers would flock to see the difference in his facial appearance before and after the crash. 

Although the results of Clift's plastic surgeries were remarkable for the time, there were noticeable differences in his facial appearance, particularly the left side of his face, which was nearly immobile. 

Continued pain from his injuries led him to rely on alcohol and pills for relief as he had done after an earlier bout with dysentery left him with chronic intestinal problems. As a result, Clift's health and physical appearance deteriorated.

Later film career: 1957–1966

For the next nine years, Clift made nearly as many films after his traumatic car accident as he had previously. Still, the last half of his 20-year career has been referred to as the "longest suicide in Hollywood history" by acting teacher Robert Lewis because of Clift's subsequent abuse of painkillers and alcohol. He began to behave erratically in public, which embarrassed his friends. His next four films were The Young Lions (1958), which is the only film featuring both Clift and Marlon Brando, Lonelyhearts (1958), Suddenly, Last Summer (1959) and Elia Kazan's Wild River, released in 1960. 

With his next two films, The Misfits (1961) and Judgment at Nuremberg (1961), Clift pivoted to somewhat smaller supporting or cameo roles that required less overall screen time while still delivering demanding performances. As the faded rodeo rider Perce Howland in The Misfits, his first, introductory scene performed inside of a phone booth only took two hours of the scheduled two shooting days which impressed cast and crew. Marilyn Monroe (in what was to be her last filmed role) was also having emotional and substance abuse problems at the time; she described Clift in a 1961 interview as "the only person I know who is in even worse shape than I am".

In his one 12-minute cameo scene in Judgment at Nuremberg (1961), Clift played a developmentally disabled German baker who had been a victim of the Nazi sterilisation programme testifying at the Nuremberg trials. Clift was willing to waive his fee entirely but accepted the supporting part with minimum compensation. His anguished performance (which earned him his fourth Academy Award nomination) was often thought to be due to his own nervous breakdown. Director Stanley Kramer, later wrote in his memoirs that Clift "wasn't always close to the script, but whatever he said fitted in perfectly" and that he suggested Clift turn to Spencer Tracy to "ad lib something" when he struggled to remember his lines for his one scene. In nephew Robert Anderson Clift's 2018 documentary, superimposed pages of Clift's own heavily annotated original script show that the actor was actually deliberately and consciously performing with his own rewritten dialogue as opposed to confused improvisation. On a taped phone call, Clift said that he played the character in a way that "holds onto himself, in spite of himself" with dignity.

After completing John Huston's Freud: The Secret Passion (1962), Universal Studios sued him for his frequent absences that caused the film to go over budget. Clift countersued with the assertion that he struggled to keep up with an overwhelming volume of last-minute script revisions and that an accidental blow to both eyes on set gave him cataracts. The case was later settled out of court, with evidence in Clift's favor, but the damage to Clift's reputation as unreliable and troublesome endured. As a consequence, he was unable to find film work for four years. The film's success at the box office brought numerous awards for screenwriting and directing, but none for Clift himself.

On January 13, 1963, a few weeks after the initial release of Freud, Clift appeared on the live television discussion program The Hy Gardner Show, where he spoke at length about the release of his current film, his film career, and treatment by the press. He also talked publicly for the first time about his 1956 car accident, the injuries he received, and its aftereffects on his appearance. During the interview, Gardner jokingly mentioned that it is "the first and last appearance on a television interview program for Montgomery Clift".

Barred from feature films, Clift turned to voice work. In 1964, he recorded for Caedmon Records The Glass Menagerie, with Jessica Tandy, Julie Harris, and David Wayne. In 1965, he gave voice to William Faulkner's writings in the television documentary William Faulkner's Mississippi, which aired in April 1965.

During this time, Peter Bogdanovich was working at a cinema in New York City when Clift came to see a revival screening of one of his early films – I Confess (1953) – and decided to show him the guestbook where a cinema patron had written in a film request for "Anything with Montgomery Clift!"

Elizabeth Taylor put her salary on the line as insurance in order to have Clift cast as her co-star in Reflections in a Golden Eye, to be directed by John Huston. In preparation for the shooting of this film, Clift accepted the role of James Bower in the French Cold War thriller The Defector, which was filmed in West Germany from February to April 1966. He insisted on performing his stunts himself, including swimming in the river Elbe in March. The schedule for Reflections in a Golden Eye was then set for August 1966, but Clift died in July 1966. Marlon Brando was cast as his replacement.

Personal life
Clift is said to have valued privacy and ambiguity in his personal life, though he was known to be friendly and affectionate, blurring the emotions of platonic love and sexual attraction, particularly with close friend Elizabeth Taylor, as soon as Paramount Pictures arranged her to attend the Los Angeles premiere of The Heiress as Clift's date to generate publicity. 

Paramount executive Luigi Luraschi remembered that Taylor, just like many American teenagers, seemed "unmistakably in love" with Clift around the time of filming A Place in the Sun, which commenced soon after their premiere outing. They starred together as romantic leads in a total of three films throughout the 1950s: A Place in the Sun, where, in their romantic scenes, they received considerable acclaim for their naturalness and their appearance, Raintree County and Suddenly, Last Summer, and remained close until his death. 

In 2000, at the GLAAD Media Awards, where Taylor was honored for her work for the LGBT community, she made the first public declaration by anyone of the fact that Clift was gay and called him her closest friend and confidant. According to Clift's brother, Clift was either gay or bisexual. Montgomery Clift informed his psychiatrist that he was homosexual and struggling to cope with it. In a taped telephone conversation with his brother, Clift's mother stated she had known Clift was homosexual early on.

Many of Clift's biographers note his relationships with men and some few women based on friends' accounts and interviews. He was linked to actresses Libby Holman and Phyllis Thaxter. Clift's longest relationships were with men. He was involved with the Adventures of Superman actor Jack Larson and theater actor William LeMassena, with whom he had a three-year relationship. LeMassena remained a close friend to Clift until his death. He described their relationship with fondness and kept taped film reels of Clift and the company of There Shall Be No Night enjoying leisure time together. 

Clift was deeply and intensely involved with Broadway choreographer Jerome Robbins; very few associates were aware of how intimate and emotionally charged the relationship between the pair was. Clift and Robbins camouflaged their relationship by dating women. In 1948, when Clift left Robbins to pursue a movie career in Hollywood, the announcement devastated Robbins. He told Clift "I could make you love me," at the end of their two-year affair.
 
Robbins is said to have conceived the basic plot of West Side Story after Clift shared the idea with him, according to actor Russ Tamblyn. In 2021, Tamblyn recalled that Robbins "told us on the set one day that the idea really came from Montgomery Clift, who was Jerry's boyfriend at the time... He said that he was with Monty at a party on Fire Island … [and Clift said] 'I've got an idea for a musical. Why not have a musical about Romeo and Juliet but make it with gangs in New York?' And Jerry said that he just couldn't get it out of his head." Robbins called Clift a "theatrical genius" early on in their affair.

In the early 1950s, Barney Balaban (president of Paramount Pictures) invited Clift on one of the Balaban family vacations to Nassau, Bahamas. Judy Balaban, his daughter, has stated that she had an immediate connection with Clift and the two were "joined at the hip," dating for many months following. She attended the New York premiere of A Place in the Sun in August 1951 as his date.

While the press assumed that Balaban and Clift were an item, Clift secretly dated British actor Roddy McDowall. According to Balaban, she was naïve about Clift's homosexuality and romantic involvement with the young English actor, who would occasionally accompany them on public outings.

McDowall was introduced to Clift by his Lassie Come Home co-star Elizabeth Taylor, who was a lifelong friend of both actors. During the two and a half years that Clift stayed away from films, McDowall's career was nonexistent. McDowall devoted himself to Clift entirely, and he moved from Los Angeles to New York to be closer to his idol. It is said that McDowall took the breakup with Clift hard. Nevertheless, he showed no bitterness and remained one of Clift's loyal friends. McDowall starred with Clift in his final picture, The Defector. Clift later stated that he could never have finished the film without McDowall's moral support.

While filming for Vittorio De Sica in Italy, Clift had a romance with Truman Capote. One of Clift's first intimate relationships was with composer Lehman Engel. He was also involved with Donald Windham and his partner Sandy Campbell. In his memoir, Arthur Laurents suggests that Clift had a fling with Farley Granger.

Clift was also friends with Marlon Brando, who dropped by his home offering to accompany him to Alcoholics Anonymous meetings.

Clift supported Adlai Stevenson in the 1952 United States presidential election.

Death

On July 22, 1966, Clift was in his New York City townhouse, located at 217 East 61st Street. He and his private nurse, Lorenzo James, had not spoken much all day. After midnight, shortly before 1:00 a.m., James went to his own bedroom to sleep, without saying another word to Clift. 

At 6:30 a.m., James woke up and went to wake Clift, but found the bedroom door closed and locked. Concerned and unable to break the door down, James ran down to the back garden and climbed up a ladder to enter through the second-floor bedroom window. Inside, he found Clift dead: he was undressed, lying in his bed still wearing his eyeglasses and with both fists clenched by his side. James then used the bedroom telephone to call some of Clift's personal physicians and the medical examiner's office before an ambulance arrived.

The autopsy report cited the cause of death as a heart attack brought on by "occlusive coronary artery disease". No evidence was found that suggested foul play or suicide. 

It is commonly believed that drug addiction was responsible for Clift's many health problems and his death. In addition to lingering effects of dysentery and chronic colitis, an underactive thyroid was later revealed during the autopsy. The condition (among other things) lowers blood pressure; it could have caused Clift to appear drunk or drugged when he was sober. Underactive thyroids also raise cholesterol, which might have contributed to his heart disease.

Following a 15-minute funeral at St. James' Church on Madison Avenue in Manhattan, which was attended by 150 guests, including Lauren Bacall, Frank Sinatra, and Nancy Walker, Clift was buried in the Friends Quaker Cemetery, Prospect Park, Brooklyn. Elizabeth Taylor, who was in Rome, sent flowers, as did Roddy McDowall (who had recently co-starred with Clift in The Defector), Judy Garland, Myrna Loy, and Lew Wasserman.

Filmography

Film

Film roles declined
Clift received and declined offers for roles in the following films:

 The Adventures of Tom Sawyer (1938) –  Tommy Kelly was later cast
Mrs. Miniver (1942) – Richard Ney was later cast
 Rope (1948) – John Dall was later cast
 Sunset Boulevard (1950) – exited contract before filming; was replaced by William Holden
High Noon (1952) – Gary Cooper was later cast
 Act of Love (1953) – Kirk Douglas was later cast
 Shane (1953) – Alan Ladd was later cast
 Désirée (1954) – Marlon Brando was later cast
On the Waterfront (1954) – Marlon Brando was later cast
 Suddenly (1954)
 A Star Is Born (1954) – James Mason was later cast
 East of Eden (1955) – Richard Davalos was later cast
Not as a Stranger (1955) – Robert Mitchum was later cast
Prince of Players (1955) – Richard Burton was later cast
 War and Peace (1956) – Henry Fonda was later cast
 Friendly Persuasion (1956) – Anthony Perkins was later cast
The Bridge on the River Kwai (1957) – Geoffrey Horne was later cast
 Cat on a Hot Tin Roof (1958) – Paul Newman was later cast
 Rio Bravo (1959) – Dean Martin was later cast
 Sons and Lovers (1960) – exited contract before filming; Dean Stockwell was later cast
 Fahrenheit 451 (1966) – Oskar Werner was later cast

Television

Theatre

Radio

Awards and nominations 

In 1960, Clift was honored with a star on the Hollywood Walk of Fame at 6104 Hollywood Boulevard.

In popular culture 

The song "The Right Profile" by the English punk rock band The Clash, from their album London Calling, is about the later life of Clift. The song alludes to his car crash and drug abuse, as well as the movies A Place in the Sun, Red River, From Here to Eternity, and The Misfits, before closing with what Rolling Stone magazine describes as "a grudging admiration that becomes unexpectedly and astonishingly moving." "Monty Got a Raw Deal" by rock band R.E.M. is also about him. The song "Montgomery Clift" by British band Random Hold concerns the legend that Clift enjoyed hanging from the window ledges of tall buildings.

Clift was the subject of fascination by the character Vikar (James Franco) in the film Zeroville, which was shot in 2015 and released on September 20, 2019, in limited theaters, to largely negative reviews. The character has a tattoo of Mr. Clift and Elizabeth Taylor on his shaved head. James Franco's brother, Dave Franco, portrays Montgomery Clift in a short scene in the movie.

Clift (portrayed by Gavin Adams) was a major supporting character in the 2020 feature film As Long As I’m Famous, which explored his intimate relationship with a young Sidney Lumet during the summer of 1948.

See also
 List of actors with Academy Award nominations
 List of actors with two or more Academy Award nominations in acting categories
 List of LGBT Academy Award winners and nominees

Notes

References
 Bosworth, Patricia (1978). Montgomery Clift: A Biography. Hal Leonard Corporation, 2007. N.B.: Also published in mass-market pbk. ed. (New York: Bantam Books, 1978); originally published by Harcourt, 1978.  (H. Leonard),  (Bantam)
 Capua, Michelangelo (2002). Montgomery Clift: A Biography. McFarland. 
 Casillo, Charles (2021), Elizabeth and Monty: The Untold Story of Their Intimate Friendship. New York, Kensington Publishing Corp.  (hardcover edition)
 Clift, Robert Anderson and Hillary Demmon (2018). Making Montgomery Clift. 1091 Pictures.
 Girelli, Elisabetta (2013) "Montgomery Clift Queer Star", Wayne University Press. 
 Kramer, Stanley and Thomas M. Coffey (1997). A Mad, Mad, Mad, Mad World: A Life in Hollywood. 
 LaGuardia, Robert (1977). Monty: A Biography of Montgomery Clift. New York, Avon Books.  (paperback edition)
 Lawrence, Amy (2010) "The Passion of Montgomery Clift", Berkeley and Los Angeles, University of California Press. 
 McCann, Graham (1991). Rebel Males: Clift, Brando and Dean. H. Hamilton.

External links

 
 
 
 
 Montgomery Clift papers, 1933–1966, Billy Rose Theatre Division, New York Public Library for the Performing Arts
 Montgomery Clift papers, Additions, 1929–1969, Billy Rose Theatre Division, New York Public Library for the Performing Arts
 Screen Legends: Montgomery Clift, The Guardian
 Montgomery Clift: better than Brando, more tragic than Dean
 

1920 births
1966 deaths
20th-century American male actors
American male film actors
American male stage actors
American male radio actors
American people of English descent
American people of Scottish descent
Burials in New York (state)
LGBT male actors
LGBT people from Nebraska
Livingston family
Male actors from Omaha, Nebraska
Method actors
People from Jackson Heights, Queens
American twins
American Quakers
Deaths from coronary artery disease
20th-century Quakers